In psychology, jamais vu, a French loanword meaning "never seen", is the phenomenon of experiencing a situation that one recognizes in some fashion, but that nonetheless seems novel and unfamiliar.

Overview
Jamais vu is often described as the opposite of déjà vu. Jamais vu involves a sense of eeriness and the observer’s impression of experiencing something for the first time, despite rationally knowing that they have experienced it before. Jamais vu is sometimes associated with certain types of aphasia, amnesia, and epilepsy.

Jamais vu is more commonly explained as when a person momentarily does not recognise a word or, less commonly, a person or place, that they already know. This can be achieved by anyone by repeatedly writing or saying a specific word out loud. After a few seconds one will often, despite knowing that it is a real word, feel as if "there's no way it is an actual word."

The phenomenon is often grouped with déjà vu and presque vu (tip of the tongue, literally "almost seen").

Theoretically, a jamais vu feeling in a sufferer of a delirious disorder or intoxication could result in a delirious explanation of it, such as in Capgras delusion, in which the patient considers someone they know to be a false double or impostor. If the patient sees themselves as the impostor, the clinical setting would be the same as the one described as depersonalization; hence, jamais vus of oneself, or of the very "reality of reality", are termed depersonalization and derealization, respectively.

Experiment
A study by Chris Moulin of Leeds University asked 92 volunteers to write out "door" 30 times in 60 seconds. In July 2006 at the 4th International Conference on Memory in Sydney he reported that 68 percent of volunteers showed symptoms of jamais vu, such as beginning to doubt that "door" was a real word. Moulin believes that a similar brain fatigue underlies a phenomenon observed in some schizophrenia patients: that a familiar person has been replaced by an impostor. Moulin suggests they could be suffering from chronic jamais vu.

Causes
Jamais vu can be caused by epileptic seizures.

Related phenomena 
Déjà vu: having the strong sensation that an event or experience being experienced, has already been experienced in the past, whether it has actually happened or not. In French, this means 'already seen'.
 Tip of the tongue: almost, but not quite, remembering something.

See also 
Capgras delusion (the delusion that a friend or relative is an impostor)
Cryptomnesia
Depersonalization disorder
Derealization
Mandela effect
Semantic satiation
Uncanny

References

Further reading
 
 
 
 
 
 
 
 

Perception
Semiotics

es:Déjà vu#Jamais vu